Herb Greene, (née Herbert Ronald Greenberg, born 1929) is an American architect, artist, author and educator. Greene's architecture practice was based in Kentucky, Oklahoma and Texas. His built projects are known for an original interpretation of organic design.

Biography 

Herbert Ronald Greenberg was born in 1929 in Oneonta, New York. Greene left Syracuse University in New York in 1948 to enroll at the University of Oklahoma, where he studied under the direction of Bruce Goff, a modernist architect known for his iconoclastic design philosophy. While earning his degree and after, Greene worked for Goff, preparing architectural drawings, which are now included in The Art Institute of Chicago, Archival Collection.

During 1951 to 1954 Greene worked for John Lautner in Los Angeles, California and then relocated to Houston, Texas, where he worked for Joseph Krakower and established his own practice.

In 1957, Greene returned to the University of Oklahoma, where he and his colleagues, Bruce Goff and Mendel Glickman (1895–1967), among other faculty, developed the American School of architecture, a curriculum that emphasized individual creativity, organic forms, and experimentation. Donald MacDonald, an architect who trained under Greene and Glickman, described the American School as “a truly American ethic, which is being formulated without the usual influence of the European or Asian architectural forms and methodologies common on the East and West coasts of the United States.” Students were taught to look to sources beyond the accepted canon of western architecture and to find inspiration in everyday objects, the natural landscape, and non-western cultures such as the designs of Native American tribes of Oklahoma and the Western plains. Mickey Muennig was one of Greene's students.

Greene realized the completion of his building, The Prairie House, in 1961, a structure that pre-dated the green building movement by a decade. Located in Norman, Oklahoma, this modernist residence, integrates concepts that are now associated with smart architecture: natural materials, passive design, natural lighting and ventilation, energy efficiency, and careful site placement. Julius Shulman photographs of The Prairie House were featured in Life and Look magazines, in addition to several international publications. This media exposure brought Greene recognition for his experimental architecture and counter-culture design philosophy.

In 1964 Greene left Oklahoma to become a professor of architecture at the University of Kentucky, where he taught for 18 years and designed buildings that reflected client-centered regional architecture. Greene believed that dialogue between the architect and client was paramount to creating a design that both could support. He subscribed to the philosophy that ultimately the users and clients needed to make buildings their own. He did this through the integration of regional and historical references and by incorporating the client's personal objects into a meaningful relationship with the actual design such as in the Joyce Residence.

Greene has lived in Berkeley, California, since 1982, where he continues to explore the interdisciplinary realm of architecture, art, science and philosophy. He is a published author, on the subject of visual perception and neurobiological systems. Greene's work as an artist, architect and writer explores symbolic relationships between memory, experience, object and environment.

Legacy 

Greene carried forward the American School legacy in his projects throughout the Great Plains area and Kentucky, focusing on contextual relationships to site and climate with an experimental and resourceful consideration of materials. Like his mentors, Greene strives for an individual solution to problem solving, stressing the particular over the general, however his fascination with the role of architectural symbols as a means of expanding individual expression, is an approach that is unique to his personal architecture practice.

Greene's work is known for original concepts, organic design characteristics and connections to landscape. His architectural drawings are in The Art Institute of Chicago's archival collection alongside work by Louis Sullivan (1856-1924), Frank Lloyd Wright (1867-1959), Bruce Goff (1904-82) and others associated with the “Prairie Tradition”.

Greene's architectural work has been included in exhibitions throughout the United States, including "Modern Architecture USA", 1965, Museum of Modern Art, NY; "Environmental Architecture", 1967, Kansas City Art Institute, MI; "An American Architecture",1977, Milwaukee Art Center, WI; "The Continuous Present of Organic Architecture",1991, Cincinnati Contemporary Arts Center, OH; and "Time Space Existence", 2018, Venice Architecture Biennale, University of Oklahoma installation in Palazzo Bembo, Italy.

Art practice and influences 

Greene's visual art practice spans six decades. His work investigates ways in which an event is represented in the mind and how associative meaning evolves into other states of perception. Central to this concept, which Greene derived from Alfred North Whitehead, is the notion that objects are not static entities and have multiple aspects that are apparent by various cues that can be measured against our own biological constructs that form emotional and intellectual experiences. Greene's other influences include the philosophical views of Gertrude Stein (1874-1946), George Lakoff (1941) and Mark Johnson (1949). His paintings are in private collections across the United States and in the permanent collection of The Art Institute of Chicago.

In 1962 the Oklahoma City Art Museum presented the first exhibition of Greene's paintings. Later exhibitions include the Illinois Biennial, 1965, Krannert Art Museum, IL; Fine Arts Gallery, 1966, University of Arkansas, AK; Kovler Gallery, 1966, Chicago IL; Phoenix Gallery, 1970, NY; University of Kentucky, Fine Arts Gallery, 1974, KY; Living Arts and Science Center, 1975, KY; and The Louisville Arts Association, 1976, KY. In 1977 Greene received a National Endowment for the Arts grant.

Selected architectural works 

 1954- Southwest Bell Offices, Houston, Texas
 1957- Lyne Residence, Houston, Texas
 1959- Joyce Residence, Snyder, Oklahoma
 1960-1961- The Prairie House, Norman, Oklahoma
 1962- Cunningham Residence, Oklahoma City, Oklahoma
 1965- Unitarian Church, Lexington, Kentucky
 1966- French Residence, Versailles, Kentucky
 1977- Cook Residence, Louisville, Kentucky
 1981- Villa Blanca Farm, Lexington, Kentucky

Published works 
 Herb Greene, Mind and Image: An Essay on Art and Architecture, The University Press of Kentucky, 1976
 Herb Greene, Building to Last, Architecture as Ongoing Art, Architectural Book Publishing Company, 1981
 Herb Greene, Painting the Mental Continuum: Perception and Meaning in the Making, Berkeley Hills Books, 2003
 Herb Greene and Lila Cohen, Generations: Six Decades of Collage Art and Architecture, Generated with Perspectives from Science, Oro Editions, 2015

References 

1929 births
People from Oneonta, New York
University of Oklahoma alumni
20th-century American architects
American male painters
Living people
20th-century American male artists